Alemu Megertu (born 12 October 1997) is an Ethiopian long-distance runner. In 2019, she won the women's race at the Rome Marathon held in Rome, Italy. Megertu also set a new course record of 2:22:52.

In 2020, she finished in fifth place in the women's race at the 2020 London Marathon held in United Kingdom.

In February 2022, she won the Zurich Seville Marathon in Seville, Spain in a course record and personal best time of 2:18:51. Megertu secured her first medal at a World Marathon Major at the 2022 London Marathon in October, with a bronze in a new lifetime best of 2:18:32.

Personal bests
 Half marathon – 1:06:43 (Copenhagen 2019)
 Marathon – 2:18:32 (London 2022)

References

External links
 

Living people
1997 births
Place of birth missing (living people)
Ethiopian female long-distance runners
Ethiopian female marathon runners
21st-century Ethiopian women